The Super Coupe du Congo English: Congo Super Cup, is an association football cup competition held in the Republic of Congo. The competition is held between the Coupe du Congo champions and the Congo Premier League champions of the same season.

Winners
List of winners:

References 

Football competitions in the Republic of the Congo